In mathematics, the power set (or powerset) of a set  is the set of all subsets of , including the empty set and  itself. In axiomatic set theory (as developed, for example, in the ZFC axioms), the existence of the power set of any set is postulated by the axiom of power set. 

Example

 
 
 
 
 
 
 

Properties
This fact as well as the reason of the notation  denoting the power set  are demonstrated in the below.
 An indicator function or a characteristic function of a subset A of a set S with the cardinality |S| = n is a function from S to the two elements set {0, 1}, denoted as IA: S → {0, 1}, and it indicates whether an element of S belongs to A or not; If x in S belongs to A, then IA(x) = 1, and 0 otherwise. Obviously  holds.
Cantor's diagonal argument shows that the power set of a set (whether infinite or not) always has strictly higher cardinality than the set itself (or informally, the power set must be larger than the original set). In particular, Cantor's theorem shows that the power set of a countably infinite set is uncountably infinite. The power set of the set of natural numbers can be put in a one-to-one correspondence with the set of real numbers (see Cardinality of the continuum).

The power set of a set , together with the operations of union, intersection and complement, can be viewed as the prototypical example of a Boolean algebra. In fact, one can show that any finite Boolean algebra is isomorphic to the Boolean algebra of the power set of a finite set. For infinite Boolean algebras, this is no longer true, but every infinite Boolean algebra can be represented as a subalgebra of a power set Boolean algebra (see Stone's representation theorem).

The power set of a set  forms an abelian group when it is considered with the operation of symmetric difference (with the empty set as the identity element and each set being its own inverse), and a commutative monoid when considered with the operation of intersection. It can hence be shown, by proving the distributive laws, that the power set considered together with both of these operations forms a Boolean ring.

Representing subsets as functions

However, such finite binary representation is only possible if S can be enumerated.

Relation to binomial theorem
The binomial theorem is closely related to the power set.

For example, the power set of a set with three elements, has:

C(3, 0) = 1 subset with 0 elements (the empty subset),
C(3, 1) = 3 subsets with 1 element (the singleton subsets),
C(3, 2) = 3 subsets with 2 elements (the complements of the singleton subsets),
C(3, 3) = 1 subset with 3 elements (the original set itself).

Using this relationship, we can compute  using the formula:

Therefore, one can deduce the following identity, assuming :

Recursive definition
If  is a finite set, then a recursive definition of  proceeds as follows:

If , then .

In words: 
 The power set of the empty set is a singleton whose only element is the empty set.

Subsets of limited cardinality

Power object
A set can be regarded as an algebra having no nontrivial operations or defining equations.

The power set of a set, when ordered by inclusion, is always a complete atomic Boolean algebra, and every complete atomic Boolean algebra arises as the lattice of all subsets of some set. The generalization to arbitrary algebras is that the set of subalgebras of an algebra, again ordered by inclusion, is always an algebraic lattice, and every algebraic lattice arises as the lattice of subalgebras of some algebra. So in that regard, subalgebras behave analogously to subsets.

However, there are two important properties of subsets that do not carry over to subalgebras in general.  First, although the subsets of a set form a set (as well as a lattice), in some classes it may not be possible to organize the subalgebras of an algebra as itself an algebra in that class, although they can always be organized as a lattice.  Secondly, whereas the subsets of a set are in bijection with the functions from that set to the set {0,1} = 2, there is no guarantee that a class of algebras contains an algebra that can play the role of 2 in this way.

Certain classes of algebras enjoy both of these properties. The first property is more common, the case of having both is relatively rare. One class that does have both is that of multigraphs.

What is special about a multigraph as an algebra is that its operations are unary. An algebra all of whose operations are unary is called a presheaf. Every class of presheaves contains a presheaf  that plays the role for subalgebras that 2 plays for subsets. Such a class is a special case of the more general notion of elementary topos as a category that is closed (and moreover cartesian closed) and has an object , called a subobject classifier. Although the term "power object" is sometimes used synonymously with exponential object , in topos theory  is required to be .

Functors and quantifiers
In category theory and the theory of elementary topoi, the universal quantifier can be understood as the right adjoint of a functor between power sets, the inverse image functor of a function between sets; likewise, the existential quantifier is the left adjoint.

See also

 Cantor's theorem
 Family of sets
 Field of sets
Combination

References

Bibliography

External links

 
 
 Power set Algorithm in C++

Operations on sets